{{Infobox television
| image                = SunnyHappiness.jpg
| caption              = Promotional poster
| alt_name             =
| genre                = Romance comedy
| creator              = 
| director             = 
| developer            = 
| presenter            = 
| starring             = Mike HeJanine ChangLi Yifeng
| voices               = 
| narrated             = 
| theme_music_composer = 
| opentheme            = 
| endtheme             = 
| composer             = 
| country              = ChinaTaiwan
| language             = Mandarin
| num_series           = 
| num_episodes         = 25 (Mainland China)16 (Taiwan)
| list_episodes        = 
| company              = Anhui Golden Key Media Company
| executive_producer   = 
| location             = Taipei, Taiwan
| camera               = 
| runtime              = 
| distributor          = 
| network              = Anhui TV (China)CTV (Taiwan)
| picture_format       = 
| audio_format         = 
| first_aired          = 
| last_aired           =  (China)
   -  (Taiwan)
| preceded_by          = 
| followed_by          = 
| related              = Happy and Love Forever Happy Michelin Kitchen 
}}Sunny Happiness (Chinese: 幸福最晴天) is a 2011 Chinese–Taiwanese co-produced television series starring Mike He and Janine Chang. The series was aired in China on Anhui TV and in Taiwan on CTV. The series is part of a Taiwanese drama trilogy which consists of Happy and Love Forever (2010) and Happy Michelin Kitchen'' (2012).

Li Yifeng won Best New Actor at the 3rd China TV Drama Awards.

Synopsis
Xiang Yun Jie (Mike He) is a young, rich and divorced owner of an expanding company. Fang Yong Yong (Janine Chang) works as a housekeeper in a hotel owned by Xiang Yun Jie.

When Xiang Yun Jie decides to demolish an orphanage which is located on a very valuable piece of land to construct a new shopping mall, this orphanage is revealed to be Fang Yong Yong's old home. As Fang Yong Yong begins to work as a nanny as well, she finds out that Xiang Yun Jie is not the golden bachelor he pretends to be, because he actually has an eight-year-old child. However, Xiang Yun Jie did not know himself that he has a child, as he thought that his ex-wife had aborted their child. After discovering the truth, he wants to gain custody of the child, as his ex-wife refuses to let him spend time with his child.

At around the same time, Fang Yong Yong finds out that Xiang Yun Jie is responsible for the mall project. Because both are now in need of something, Xiang Yun Jie decides to give Fang Yong Yong the prospect of saving the orphanage in exchange for a fake marriage which has to last exactly one year (as he wants to gain custody, he can only do that by providing the child with a whole family).

Cast
 Mike He as Xiang Yun Jie
 Janine Chang as Fang Yong Yong
 Li Yifeng as Xiang Yunchao
 Zhou Zi Han as Wang Lan
 Li Jin Ming as Kong Xin Jie
 Li Zhi Nan as Huang Si Han
 Zheng Wei as Wang Nian Jie
 Akio Chen as Fang Shen Fa
 Chen You Fang as Lin Gui Zhi
 Tang Ling as Jin Jing
 Liao Hui Zhen as Jin Wen
 Wu Zhen Ya as Ba Hu
 Zhang Qian as Xiang Jing Song
 Li Ping  as Wang Ya Shu
 Ma Li Ou 
 Kou Jia Rui as Ah Hao
 Ming Dao as Yin Ding Qiang (cameo)
 Annie Chen as Pan Xiao Nuo (cameo)
 Heaven Hai as Supervisor (cameo)

Soundtrack

References

External links
 Sunny Happiness on CTV

Anhui Television original programming
China Television original programming
2011 Chinese television series debuts
2011 Chinese television series endings
2011 Taiwanese television series debuts
2011 Taiwanese television series endings
Television shows written by Ryan Tu
Chinese romantic comedy television series